John Bosley may refer to:

 John Bosley (politician) (born 1947), Canadian former politician
 John Bosley (Charlie's Angels), a fictional detective of Charlie's Angels

See also 
 John Bosley Ziegler (1920–1983), American physician